The Dent d'Oche is a mountain in the Haute-Savoie region of France, in the Chablais massif, near the Swiss-French border, that rises to  in altitude. It towers above Évian, Thonon, and Lake Geneva. It offers a view of the French and Swiss Alps and the Swiss prealps.

It is the northernmost summit above  in France.
 

In summer, the refuge and the summit can be reached by a hike that is doable without special equipment, but significantly more difficult than the usual routes to nearby peaks such as Cornettes de Bise and Le Grammont. Reaching the refuge involves some short climbing sections for which chains are provided.  The hike from the refuge up to the summit involves some unsecured sections along a cliff, where a misstep would be fatal.

There is an alternative hiking route to the summit, from the east, that is even more delicate.

Certain sections require extensive technical skill. The first ascent of the north face was achieved by Joseph Ravanel, his siblings Arthur and Camille and François Jacquier on 6 June 1925.

References

External links

Dent d'Oche on Summitpost

Mountains of the Alps
Mountains of Haute-Savoie